María Xiao Yao (born 19 May 1994 in Calella, Catalonia) is a Portuguese-Spanish table tennis player. Born in Calella to Chinese parents, Daili Xiao and Yao Li, who were themselves professional table-tennis players that have emigrated from China to Spain to seek better opportunities in the sports. Xiao was raised in Madeira, Portugal when her parents moved there. She represented Portugal before 2012 and Spain afterwards. She was Portugal's reserve player for the 2012 Summer Olympics.

References 

1994 births
Living people
Sportspeople from Barcelona
People from Madeira
Portuguese female table tennis players
Spanish female table tennis players
Portuguese people of Chinese descent
Spanish people of Chinese descent
Table tennis players at the 2010 Summer Youth Olympics
Mediterranean Games medalists in table tennis
Mediterranean Games gold medalists for Spain
Competitors at the 2018 Mediterranean Games
Table tennis players at the 2020 Summer Olympics
Olympic table tennis players of Spain